Johann Georg Specht (20 December 1721 – 30 December 1803) was born in Lindenberg im Allgäu. He was a civil engineer and architect in the south of Germany.

Johann Georg Specht trained as a civil engineer with Peter Thumb in Vorarlberg.

Specht planned and had a vast number of edifices and other constructions built in Upper Swabia and the Allgäu, amongst which are as varied constructions as water works, bridges, mills, residential buildings, industrial buildings and even castles and churches.

His main and most famous project was the monastery church St. Martin at Wiblingen Abbey in 1771. He planned and designed the church but was not allowed to execute the building works when the Bavarian painter and civil engineer Januarius Zick was contracted in 1778 to complete the building works after Specht had been dismissed in December 1777.

Works 
 1748–1750: industrial building at castle Ratzenried
 1751: parish church in Eglofs
 1753: parish church in Baisingen near Nagold
 1754: castle Amtzell
 1855–1756: hunting castle and chapel St Leonard in Rimpach near Leutkirch
 1765: extension of the parish church in Lindenberg/Allgäu
 1771: parish church in Wiggensbach near Kempten/Allgäu
 1771-1778: church at Wiblingen Abbey
 1776-1779: castle Kleinlaupheim in Laupheim
 1778: mail coach station in Kempten/Allgäu
 1782: industrial buildings at Irsee Monastery
 1786-1789: castle Neutrauchberg near Isny
 1792: parish church in Scheidegg near Lindenberg im Allgäu

Honour
A street in Lindenberg im Allgäu has been named Baumeister-Specht-Strasse.

Further reading

External links
  Webpage about Wiblingen Abbey
 German webpage about Specht's work in Amtzell (in German)

German Baroque architects
German civil engineers
1720 births
1803 deaths
People from Lindenberg im Allgäu
Engineers from Bavaria